Feng Tang (born May 13, 1971) whose real name is Zhang Haipeng, is a Chinese contemporary novelist, poet, and private equity investor.

Life and career 
Feng Tang was born on May 13, 1971, in Beijing. He lived in Chuiyangliu, where was referred frequently in his works, for his childhood and teenage. The young Feng Tang studied in Beijing No.80 High School from 1984 until 1990. After finishing high school, he attended Peking Union Medical College and earned a doctoral degree in clinical medicine with a specialisation in gynaecological oncology in 1998. Two years later, he graduated from Emory University Goizueta Business school's MBA program with scholarship and  joined McKinsey & Company.

In 2001, when Feng Tang was 30 years old and freshly graduated from his MBA program, his first book "Everything Grows 萬物生長" was published in China. During the next years, he continuously worked and published some novels, short stories, poetries, and essays, included his first trilogy "The Beijing Trilogy 北京三部曲", which is one of his most famous works. In 2005, he earned the third People's Literature Award, established by People's Literature Magazine, the most iconic literature magazine in China.

In 2011, his novel "Oneness 不二" was published in Hong Kong and gained a wider recognition for his literary talents. The book broke the sales record in Hong Kong at the time, and the media humorously proclaimed that "from now on, Hong Kong's publishing industry relies on Feng Tang". In 2012, Feng Tang was listed at the top of the "Top 20 under 40 future literature masters in China",  a onetime list issued by People's Literature magazine.

While working as a full-time business professional, Feng Tang continued to write in his spare time. In 2014, his another novel "No Woman, No Cry 女神一號/素女經(HK version)" was published in Hong Kong and Mainland China again.

In July 2014, Feng Tang felt he needed to learn how to slow down and to live in quietness, he resigned from China Resources Healthcare Group Limited and got a short residence in California, while he was approached by Zhejiang Literature and Arts Publishing House to re-translate Tagore's Stray Birds in Chinese. He rented a house near the Napa Valley, shabby, but with a large yard, and spent three months on translating Stray Birds. The book received a huge controversy and criticism when published in 2015 and finally has been taken down from the shelves a few months later. Nonetheless, Feng Tang believed his translation better reflects contemporary Chinese language, history and literature will make their judgments.

In early of 2015, Feng Tang backed to Hong Kong and joined Citic Capital Partners Management Limited as a senior management director.In addition to being a professional, he keeps on writing as a serious hobby. In 2017, the Guomai Publishing House and Motie Publishing House hold autograph seminars for Feng Tang throughout China and attracted crowds of fans. He began to attend online programmes and collaborated with others to conduct calligraphy exhibitions.

In 2019, Feng Tang was named by the GQ magazine as one of the most influential authors in the past ten years, and he was rated as the author with the best-selling record of all time by Dangdang, the most famous online book selling website in China. In 2020, Feng Tang has been nominated and selected as the recipient of Emory University's Sheth Distinguished International Alumni Award.

In January 2021, Feng Tang left Citic Capital and found Oneness Consulting Company. He continued by writing on literature and general management, and giving online audio lectures.

Written works

Novels 
Feng Tang is best known for his novels "Beijing Trilogy" and "Oneness". In his novels, Feng Tang has a persisting interest in the dynamics of libido and the anima image, employing them as guiding tools in his exploration of the human experience. These themes, although explored by earlier Chinese writers, have been to a certain degree unheeded in the modern era. These recurrent themes have conditioned his unique style of writing, which ranges from exaggerated, rebellious, and even at times obscene, elegant and poetic. Despite the contrast, he maintains a tasteful balance and commands a singular artistic vision throughout his books. His distinctive style is so recognizable and often imitated that it has been dubbed by the public: the "Feng Tang Ti".

His "Beijing Trilogy" is a series of autobiographical novels dealing with his childhood, teenage years, early adulthood and beyond. The first book of the trilogy (chronologically the second book in the series but published first) "Everything Grows" was published in 2001. The book was later adapted into a film in 2015, starring some of China's top actors such as Fan Bingbing and Han Geng. In 2007, the book was translated and published in French. The next book, "Give Me a Girl at Age Eighteen 十八歲給我一個姑娘" was published in 2005 and was later adapted into a 21-episode drama by Youku, China's largest video steaming provider. It was translated and published in French and Italian in 2009 and 2020 respectively. The last book of the trilogy " Beijing, Beijing 北京, 北京" was published in 2007, and translated in English in 2015. In 2017 the book was adapted into a 40-episode drama series Shall I Compare You to a Spring Day and aired in July. The drama won the "29th China TV Golden Eagle Award" in Outstanding Television Series category in 2018. 

"Oneness" (the Buddhist concept of "non-dualism") was published in 2011, subverted the stories of historical figures from the Tang dynasty in a tale of sexually adventurous monks, nuns, and poets. It is Feng Tang's most famous work and be the best-selling novel in HK publishing history.

The other novels included "Happiness 歡喜", and "No Woman, No Cry", which was published in 2007 and 2014 respectively. "Happiness" was written when Feng Tang was seventeen. It is a school life story set in Beijing in the late eighties and talking about various adolescent behaviours in the high school. "No Woman, No Cry" describes the complicated life of a biotech start up company CEO, and his efforts to write a unique book entitled On Everything.

Poems 
Feng Tang always put himself as a poet, although he is often considered as one of the finest novelists of this generation. He wrote almost 800 poems, most of them relatively short. He created a new style of writing poems, which advocated to express by using very concise and refined wordings.

Feng Tang's first collection of poetry, "One Hundred Poems of Feng Tang 馮唐詩百首", was published in 2011 and collected 116 poems, included the highly acclaimed poem "Spring (春)". His best-known poems are probably those dealing with nature and love. "All Three Lines 不三" is his other work on poetry in 2018. It collected 305 poetries, and each poetry comprised by 3 sentences.

In 2015, Feng Tang collaborated with his DJ friend YangCheng, and selected almost fifty passages from his novels, poetries, essays to conduct a book with CD, which called "Reciting Poems 吟詩". Four new poetries have been collected in this book as well.

In August 2014, Feng Tang was invited to translate the Tagore's "Stray Birds" in Chinese. However, he was being widely criticized when the book published in 2015. The critics thought Feng Tang has overstepped as a translator by sexing up Tagore's soft-toned poems and strayed too far from the original text. Feng Tang insisted the spirit of translation is to break the stiff-necked of habit and continuously making innovations. He believes the most important role for artists is to destroy the old world and create a new one. After four years, "Stray Birds 飛鳥集" was re-published by Cosmos Books in Hong Kong.

Short Stories 
Feng Tang's best-known collection of short stories include "Of All The Balls 天下卵" and "So Insane 搜神記". "Of All The Balls" published in 2012 and changed the title as "安陽" when re-published in 2017. The book includes eight short stories, dealing with the materials from history, fairy tale, and reality. In 2020, the book was translated by Lavinia Benedetti and published in Italian. "Of All The Balls", "So Insane" and "Oneness" have been formed as a new trilogy named "supernatural trilogy".

"So Insane" assembles eight short stories: " In Your Twenties", "On Masturbation is One Type of Sport", "Perfect Enlightenment", "The Duck Man", "Fifty One Spotlights", "The Clitoris Yoga Master", "The Twilight Chef", and "All Kinds of Plants in This World are Beautiful". In November 2015, Feng Tang hosted a TV show "Sou Shen Ji" and interviewed 13 distinctive figures in China from different industries. In 2017, "So Insane" was published based on the show.  The book just like a supernatural story collection, but characters in this book are real people, troubled by their own emotions or facing some kinds of dilemma in life, their "insanity" or superpower described in the book, comes from their bodies and sensual instincts. Feng Tang believes the sensual instinct of a human being has unlimited potentials, which will never be replaced by artificial intelligence.

Essays 
In 2005, Feng Tang published his first collection of essay "Pig and Butterfly 豬和蝴蝶" and earned the award from People's Literature Magazine. Over the next few years, other collections of essays, includes "Aging 活著活著就老了", "How to Become a Monster 如何成為一個怪物", "36 Biggies in Life 三十六大", "Hanging on there in the Universe 在宇宙間不易被風吹散", "Fearlessness / How to fight middle age 無所畏 / 如何避免成為一個油膩的中年猥瑣男 (HK Version) ", "Shall I Compare You to a Spring Day 春風十里不如你", and "Being Capable有本事" has been published continuously. Feng Tang had a real feeling for literature, and he could impart his own passion with an admirable fluency. Most of his essays can strike a sympathetic resonance in reader's heart and mind, and bring influencing trends, such as his acclaimed essay "How to fight middle age", created a sensation when published in 2017.

Calligraphy 

In China's literary tradition, authorship and penmanship go hand in hand. Feng Tang has stayed loyal to this tradition. In July 2017, his calligraphy work "Looking into Flowers 觀花止" debuted an art exhibition "Dreaming into Flowers 夢筆生花---當代語境中的人文藝術" in Beijing, accompanied by works of many famous Chinese artists and writers, including Nobel Laureate Mo Yan.

In April 2018, Feng Tang met famous Japanese photographer Nobuyoshi Araki and the two artists collaborated on an calligraphy exhibition called "Calligraphy as Oneness 書道不二".

In December 2019 and January 2020, Feng Tang's private exhibition "Feng Tang Happy Land 馮唐樂園" was hold in Beijing and Shanghai respectively. The exhibition comprised six scenes and interpreted by calligraphy, photograph and lamplight to create a unique experience for audiences.

In March 2020, the luxury brand and pen manufacturer Mont Blanc invited Feng Tang to created Mont Blanc Feng Tang Font, which will be used in all of Mont Blanc's Chinese publishing marketing materials.

In December 2020, when the Covid-19 came, people changed their habits and spent a lot of time at home. Under this circumstance, Feng Tang's private exhibition "Otaku宅" was hold in Beijing from December 2020 to February 2021. There is total 53 pcs calligraphy works and paintings has been displayed.

In August and October 2021, his another private exhibition "Form and Emptiness色空" was hold in Beijing and HangZhou respectively. The exhibition shows 60pcs of his calligraphy works and paintings. The VR technology used in the exhibition brings a sensuous experience to the visitors.

In 2022, Feng Tang hold his 3rd round of calligraphy exhibition "Tea the Wild" has been hold in Shanghai and Beijing. It showed over 50pcs of his calligraphy works and paintings.

Business 
In addition to being an artist, Feng Tang is also a business professional. After earning his MBA degree from Emory University, he began his business career as a management consultant at McKinsey & Company in 2000, and after six years, he rose to the level of global partner.

In 2009, Feng Tang was invited to join China Resources (Holdings) Co., Limited as a General Manager of Strategy Management Department. A few months later, he formulated a strategy to explore the healthcare industry in China market for the company's development. In October 2011, he was appointed as the founding CEO of  CR Healthcare. His mission was to build China's largest corporate-managed hospital network with the most advanced management and medical capabilities, seeing this as a way to provide better healthcare service to all, and to revolutionize China's mostly state-owned medical industry. The company expanded rapidly under his management, conducted many trailblazing projects in reforming state owned hospitals, and started a trend in the investment of private medical institutions in China as the company's strategy was showing great promise for investors. One of the projects, the structural reform of Kunming Children's Hospital, stands as the textbook example on reformation and privatization of public hospitals in China to this day.

From 2015, Feng Tang moved his career to investment, again, focusing on the healthcare industry, and became the senior managing director of CITIC Capital. Trained as a clinical doctor, Feng Tang aspired to improved China's healthcare system, and through his continuous effort over the past two decades, he has made many contributions in growing and reforming China's healthcare sector. 

Over the past years, Feng Tang showed his talent in commercial world. In 2019, he began to write management books with his unique views on self-management, team management, and achieving continual success in business. Later in 2020, Feng Tang was asked to create a series of online audio lectures based on the books.

Influence 
Feng Tang's dual identity of an artist and a competent business leader struck a chord in the Chinese psyche. On one level, he is an inspiration for many who have a regular career and at the same time aspire in creative and artistic pursuits. On a deeper and more cultural level, Feng Tang is perhaps the only person in China's recent memory who reflects the age-old image of the ideal gentlemen in Chinese tradition; one who is devoted in worldly pursuits (Confucianism) and more importantly cultivates his artistical, philosophical, and spiritual virtues (Taoism and Buddhism). For this reason, Feng Tang become a cultural icon and an influencer in China.

As an influencer, Feng Tang frequently publishes essays and anecdotes on social media. He has over 10 million followers on Weibo, one of the most important Chinese social media websites. Feng Tang has been a columnist for GQ magazine in China for ten years, during which time his articles appeared in every issue of the magazine, and his portrait even appeared on the cover once. Through these articles, he promotes a more mindful lifestyle, a more naturalistic and contained aesthetics, and a better appreciation of everyday events and objects. He even provides an advice for relationships, careers, and overcoming obstacles in life, with style and humour.

References

External links 

1971 births
Living people
Poets from Beijing
21st-century Chinese male writers
21st-century Chinese novelists
21st-century Chinese poets
Chinese antiques experts
Private equity and venture capital investors
Peking Union Medical College alumni
Emory University alumni